Mutale Mulenga (born 29 September 1967) is a Zambian athlete. He competed in the men's high jump at the 1984 Summer Olympics.

References

1967 births
Living people
Athletes (track and field) at the 1984 Summer Olympics
Zambian male high jumpers
Olympic athletes of Zambia
Place of birth missing (living people)